Tour de l'Ain, also known as the Prix de l'Amitié, is an annual professional cycling stage race held in eastern France.

G.P. de l'Amitié
The first edition of the race was in 1970, as the G.P. de l'Amitié (Friendship G.P.). It was held over four or five days in early September and served as a preparation for the Tour de l'Avenir, thus attracting also international riders, especially the Spanish team. The course ran straight across the French Alpes, starting in Nice, on the Côte d'Azur, and finishing in Bourg-en-Bresse, the capital of the Bresse region, north of Lyon, at the base of the Jura mountain range. Main difficulty was the mountain finish on Les Orres. In uneven years the course was reversed: from Bourg to Nice.
As the Tour de l'Avenir threatened to be cancelled in 1976, the G.P. de l'Amitié jumped in and served as replacement, expanding the race to nine days. The execution of this event strained the organisation so much that it had to back down. From 1978 onwards the race merely had a national field of participants and was conducted only in the Provence Alpes, starting and finishing in Nice, still with the mountain finish on Les Orres.
The organisation recovered however, and opened their race to professionals in 1986. A lot of French riders used this tough race – from Nice, via Valloire (over the Galibier), to Combloux – as a preparation for the Tour de l'Avenir.

Tour de l'Ain
In 1989 new organizers came, Dante Lavacca, Armand Peracca, and Maurice Josserand. They took the race back to its roots, to Bourg-en-Bresse, and changed its name into Tour de l'Ain. From 1989 to 1992 it was an amateur event. In 1993 it became open to professionals. In 1999 Cyclisme Organisation took over the organizing of the event and in the 1999 edition for the first time the climb of the Grand Colombier was included.

The race had a 2.5 UCI (pro-am) status but was in 2002 promoted to the professional 2.3 category.

Since the inception of the UCI ProTour and the UCI Continental circuits in 2005, the race has been classed into category 2.1 (in which all former 2.1, 2.2 and 2.3 races were combined). The race, which travels through the Ain departement into the Jura Mountains, combines both sprinting and mountainous stages. The 1,534 metre high Grand Colombier has featured as a decisive climb in the stage race. The 2018 version consisted of three stages; while previous versions of the event contained four or five stages (including prologues).

Winners

References

External links

 

Cycle races in France
Recurring sporting events established in 1989
1989 establishments in France
UCI Europe Tour races